Le Pèlerin, today simply called Pèlerin, is a French weekly news magazine published in France.

History and profile
It was started as a newsletter in 1872. Le Pèlerin was first published as a weekly magazine by the Assumptionists on 12 July 1873. In 1877 it became an illustrated weekly.

The magazine is owned and published by Bayard Presse. It is one of the Catholic publications in France together with La Croix and Notre Temps. All of them are part of Bayard Presse.

Pèlerin has three main sections: current news, religious and spiritual news, and news on family, recreation and culture.

In 2010 the circulation of Pèlerin was 242,255 copies.

References

External links
Official website

1873 establishments in France
French-language magazines
News magazines published in France
Weekly magazines published in France
Magazines established in 1873
Religious magazines
Catholic magazines
Catholicism in France